The Richtmyer Memorial Award is an award for physics education, named for physicist Floyd K. Richtmyer and given annually by the American Association of Physics Teachers. Its recipients include over 15 Nobel Prize winners.

Establishment and award criteria
Floyd T. Richtmyer (1881–1939) was one of the first presidents of the American Association of Physics Teachers and his work helped shape the development of physics in the United States. The Richtmyer Award was established in 1941, and is typically given to educators who have made outstanding contributions as teachers in their fields.  It is awarded to those who have not only produced important current research in physics, but to those who have, by means of communication to both students and other educators, imparted information and motivation to participants in the field.  The effective use of a teaching method in order to pass on information, and to stimulate interest in physics, is seen as being worthy of recognition in its own right, in addition to the importance of the production of new research.

Recipients of the award deliver a Keynote Address, the annual Richtmyer Lecture, which is designed for communication with non-specialist audiences, during the AAPT Winter Meeting.

Recipients
Past recipients of the award include "a long list of giants in the field of physics"  such as UC Berkeley Chancellor Robert J. Birgeneau (1989); Steven Chu of the Lawrence Berkeley National Laboratory (1990), who also is a UC Berkeley professor of physics and a physics Nobelist, and who has been the 12th United States Secretary of Energy since 2009; and physicists Charles Townes (1959), Emilio Segrè (1957), J. Robert Oppenheimer (1947), and Nobel prize winner Carl Wieman of the University of Colorado at Boulder in 1996.

Since its foundation in 1941, the following scientists from a wide number of institutions have received this award:

Source: American Association of Physics Teachers

 1941 - Arthur H. Compton, University of Chicago
 1942 - Gordon Ferrie Hull, Dartmouth College
 1944 - Karl K. Darrow, Columbia University
 1945 - I.I. Rabi, Columbia University
 1946 - Paul E. Klopsteg, Northwestern University
 1947 - J.R. Oppenheimer, University of California
 1948 - Homer L. Dodge, Norwich University
 1949 - Lee A. DuBridge, California Institute of Technology
 1950 - John H. Van Vleck, Harvard University
 1951 - John C. Slater, Massachusetts Institute of Technology
 1952 - Enrico Fermi, University of Chicago
 1953 - Edward M. Purcell, Harvard University
 1954 - John A. Wheeler, Princeton University
 1955 - Eugene P. Wigner, Princeton University
 1956 - Walter H. Brattain, Bell Telephone Laboratories
 1957 - Emilio Segre, University of California
 1958 - Philip Morrison, Cornell University
 1959 - Charles H. Townes, Columbia University
 1960 - James A. Van Allen, State University of Iowa
 1961 - William A. Fowler, California Institute of Technology
 1962 - Thomas Gold, Cornell University
 1963 - Wolfgang K.H. Panofsky, Stanford University
 1964 - Fred Hoyle, Cambridge University
 1965 - William M. Fairbank, Stanford University
 1966 - Murray Gell-Mann, California Institute of Technology
 1967 - Robert H. Dicke, Princeton University
 1968 - Robert R. Wilson, National Accelerator Laboratory
 1969 - S. Chandrasekhar, University of Chicago
 1970 - Arthur L. Schawlow, Stanford University
 1971 - Edwin Land, Polaroid Corporation
 1972 - Robert B. Leighton, California Institute of Technology
 1973 - Michael E. Fisher, Cornell University
 1974 - Steven Weinberg, Harvard University
 1975 - Riccardo Giacconi, Harvard University
 1976 - Britton Chance, University of Pennsylvania School of Medicine
 1977 - Michael Tinkham, Harvard University
 1978 - Sidney Drell, Stanford Linear Accelerator Center
 1979 - William A. Nierenberg, Scripps Institute of Oceanography
 1980 - Edward C. Stone, California Institute of Technology
 1981 - Hans Frauenfelder, University of Illinois
 1982 - Karen McNally, Seismological Laboratory, California Institute of Technology and University of California, Santa Cruz
 1983 - Edward A. Frieman, Science Applications Inc., La Jolla, California
 1984 - David N. Schramm, University of Chicago
 1985 - Gerry Neugebauer, California Institute of Technology
 1986 - Leon M. Lederman, Fermi National Accelerator Laboratory
 1987 - Clifford M. Will, Washington University in St. Louis
 1988 - Peter A. Franken, University of Arizona
 1989 - Robert J. Birgeneau, Massachusetts Institute of Technology
 1990 - Steven Chu, Stanford University
 1991 - Larry W. Esposito, University of Colorado Boulder
 1992 - Kip S. Thorne, California Institute of Technology, Pasadena
 1993 - Richard E. Smalley, Rice University
 1994 - Sheldon Glashow, Harvard University
 1995 - Joseph Henry Taylor, Princeton University
 1996 - Carl E. Wieman, University of Colorado
 1997 - H. Eugene Stanley, Boston University
 1998 - Douglas D. Osheroff, Stanford University
 1999 - Wayne H. Knox, Bell Laboratories
 2000 - William D. Phillips, National Institute of Standards and Technology
 2001 - Shirley Ann Jackson, Rensselaer Polytechnic Institute, Troy, NY 
 2002 - Jordan A. Goodman, University of Maryland, College Park, MD 
 2003 - Margaret Murnane, University of Colorado, Boulder, CO 
 2004 - Lene Vestergaard Hau, Harvard University, Cambridge, MA 
 2005 - Carlos Bustamante, University of California, Berkeley CA 
 2006 - Neil Ashby, University of Colorado, Boulder, CO 
 2007 - Alex Filippenko, University of California, Berkeley CA 
 2008/9 - Vera Rubin, Carnegie Institution of Washington
 2010 - not Awarded
 2011 - Kathryn Moler, Geballe Laboratory for Advanced Materials and Physics, Stanford University, CA 
 2012 - Brian Greene, Columbia University, New York, NY
 2014 - Sir Michael Berry, University of Bristol
 2016 - Derek Muller, Veritasium YouTube Channel, Catalyst
 2017 - Jay M. Pasachoff, Williams College, Williamstown, MA
 2018 - Mark Beck, Whitman College, Walla Walla, Washington

Significance
It is the emphasis on mentoring younger teachers that has made the Richtmyer Award distinct from other teaching awards that centre mainly upon the education of students.  The Richtmyer Award is the forerunner of modern awards such as the Young Faculty Award (YFA) program established by DARPA, the aim of which is to identify and engage rising research stars in junior faculty positions at U.S. academic institutions.

See also

 List of physics awards

External links 
 Official website

References

Physics awards
Teacher awards